The 61st British Academy Film Awards, given by the British Academy of Film and Television Arts, took place on 10 February 2008 and honoured the best films of 2007.

Atonement won Best Film, while Coen brothers, Joel and Ethan, won Best Director for No Country for Old Men, which also went on to win Best Cinematography and Best Supporting Actor for Javier Bardem. Daniel Day-Lewis won Best Actor for There Will Be Blood, Marion Cotillard won Best Actress for La Vie en Rose (La Môme), and Tilda Swinton won Best Supporting Actress for Michael Clayton. This Is England, directed by Shane Meadows, was voted Outstanding British Film of 2007.

Winners and nominees

BAFTA Fellowship
Anthony Hopkins

Statistics

In Memoriam

Lois Maxwell
Alex Phillips
Betty Hutton
Freddie Francis
Calvin Lockhart
Brad Renfro
Charles Lane
Laszlo Kovacs
Fernando Fernan-Gomez
Jean-Pierre Cassel
Gordon Scott
Mali Finn
Michel Serrault
Michelangelo Antonioni
Victoria Hopper
Christopher Greenbury
Russell Lloyd
Jane Wyman
Brian Eatwell
Frank Capra Jr.
Alex Thomson
Peter Handford
Marcel Marceau
Marit Allen
Deborah Kerr
Richard Franklin
Ulrich Mühe
Golda Offenheim
Ingmar Bergman
Peter Zinner
Peter Ellenshaw
Heath Ledger

See also
 80th Academy Awards
 33rd César Awards
 13th Critics' Choice Awards
 60th Directors Guild of America Awards
 21st European Film Awards
 65th Golden Globe Awards
 28th Golden Raspberry Awards
 22nd Goya Awards
 23rd Independent Spirit Awards
 13th Lumières Awards
 19th Producers Guild of America Awards
 12th Satellite Awards
 34th Saturn Awards
 14th Screen Actors Guild Awards
 60th Writers Guild of America Awards

References
 ‘Atonement’ leads BAFTA longlist Variety, 4 January 2008. Retrieved 8 January 2022
 Atonements leads nominations People, 16 January 2008. Retrieved 8 January 2022.
 https://www.usatoday.com/life/movies/movieawards/2008-02-10-bafta-awards_N.htm
 Time (magazine)
 https://www.telegraph.co.uk/culture/film/3671093/Baftas-2008-Atonement-wins-top-prize.html

Film061
2008 in British cinema
2007 film awards
February 2008 events in the United Kingdom
2007 awards in the United Kingdom